The 1994 Kent State Golden Flashes football team was an American football team that represented Kent State University in the Mid-American Conference (MAC) during the 1994 NCAA Division I-A football season. In their first season under head coach Jim Corrigall, the Golden Flashes compiled a 2–9 record (2–7 against MAC opponents), finished in eighth place in the MAC, and were outscored by all opponents by a combined total of 293 to 140.

The team's statistical leaders included Astron Whatley with 1,003 rushing yards, Mike Challenger with 842 passing yards, and Chris Amill with 247 receiving yards.

Schedule

References

Kent State
Kent State Golden Flashes football seasons
Kent State Golden Flashes football